Working My Way Back to You and More Great New Hits is a 1966 album by The Four Seasons. Released in January of that year, the album is within the pop/rock genre. It included the top ten hit "Working My Way Back to You".

Track listing
"Working My Way Back to You" (Denny Randell, Sandy Linzer)
"Pity" (Bob Crewe, Mike Petrillo)
"I Woke Up" (Bob Crewe)
"Living Just for You" (Nick Massi)
"Beggars Parade" (Bob Crewe, Bob Gaudio)
"One Clown Cried" (Bob Gaudio, Sandy Linzer)
"Can't Get Enough of You Baby" (Denny Randell, Sandy Linzer)
"Sundown" (Alan Bernstein, Mike Petrillo)
"Too Many Memories" (Bob Crewe, Bob Gaudio)
"Show Girl" (Bob Crewe, Bob Gaudio)
"Comin' Up in the World" (Bob Crewe, Larry Santos)
"Everybody Knows My Name" (Bob Crewe)

Development 
This album was "rush-released", including three tracks that had previously been included in the group's previous album entitled The 4 Seasons Entertain You.

Critical reception 
William Ruhlmann of AllMusic felt that the majority of the album's tracks are decent examples of the "Gaudio-Crewe pop formula" and believes that "Everybody Knows My Name" was inspired by the folk-rock wave sound of Bob Dylan.

References 

1966 albums
The Four Seasons (band) albums
albums produced by Bob Crewe
albums arranged by Charles Calello